Ea H'leo is a district (huyện) of Đắk Lắk province in the Central Highlands region of Vietnam. Ea H'leo is between Gia Lai Province and Buôn Hồ District flowing Highway 14. Ea H'leo has great soil fertility, huge forests and other different resources such as rubber and pepper. The main income of the population is coffee.

As of 2003 the district had a population of 106,185. The district covers an area of 1,331 km2. The district capital lies at Ea Drăng.

Divisions 
Besides the capital Ea'Đrăng, Ea H'leo has 11 villages:

 Cư A Mung
 Ea H'leo
 Ea Tir
 Ea Nam
 Ea Khăl
 Ea Ral
 Ea Sol
 Cư Mốt
 Ea Hiao
 Dliê Yang
 Ea Wy

References

Districts of Đắk Lắk province